Two human polls comprised the 1994 National Collegiate Athletic Association (NCAA) Division I-A football rankings. Unlike most sports, college football's governing body, the NCAA, does not bestow a national championship, instead that title is bestowed by one or more different polling agencies. There are two main weekly polls that begin in the preseason—the AP Poll and the Coaches Poll.

Legend

AP Poll

Coaches Poll

Auburn, Texas A&M, and Washington were ineligible to be ranked in the Coaches' Poll due to NCAA sanctions.

References

NCAA Division I FBS football rankings